Elizabeth Richter is an American government official who served as the acting administrator of the Centers for Medicare & Medicaid Services from January to May 2021.

Career
Richter has served with the Centers for Medicare and Medicaid Services since she joined the Bureau of Policy Development in 1990. In 1998, she transferred to the Office of Financial Management, where three years later she became the Director of the Financial Services Group. In 2003, Richter became the Director of the Hospital and Ambulatory Policy Group. Most recently, she has served as the Deputy Director of the Center for Medicare since 2007. In 2021, Joe Biden appointed Richter to succeed Seema Verma as acting administrator until a permanent administrator is confirmed. Richter stayed in that office until her successor, Chiquita Brooks-LaSure was confirmed and sworn in on May 27, 2021.

References

Living people
American health care chief executives
American women chief executives
Biden administration personnel
United States Department of Health and Human Services officials
Year of birth missing (living people)
21st-century American women